Lancaster County Courthouse is a historic courthouse in Lancaster, South Carolina.  Built in 1828, it has been in continuous use since then.  It was designated a National Historic Landmark in 1973, as a possible work of Robert Mills, an important American architect of the first half of the 19th century.  It also has the distinction of being the site of the last witch trials to take place in the United States.

Description and history
The Lancaster County Courthouse is located in the heart of downtown Lancaster, at the southwest corner of Meeting Street (South Carolina Highway 9) and Main Street (United States Route 521).  It is a two-story masonry structure, built out of locally-made bricks laid in English bond, with Flemish bond around the windows.  Its main facade is five bays wide, with the main entrance on the second floor, accessed via stairs on either side of a projecting classical temple front supported by Tuscan columns.  Windows are rectangular, set in round-arch openings.  The interior of the ground floor has barrel-vaulted ceilings, providing support for the upper floor.  The judge's bench in the main courtroom is a particularly fine example of Federal period wood carving.

The courthouse was built in 1828 by Willis Alsobrook, and its design has been attributed, without conclusive evidence, to the architect Robert Mills, who is known to have designed the old 1823 county jail, also a National Historic Landmark.  The building has been in continuous use as a courthouse since its construction.

In 2008, the courthouse was heavily damaged, but not destroyed, by fire caused by arson; it will be rebuilt.  On September 19, 2008, a local 17-year-old, Martavious Carter, was accused for setting the fire while being interviewed for other crimes he had recently committed.

See also
List of National Historic Landmarks in South Carolina
National Register of Historic Places listings in Lancaster County, South Carolina

References

External links

Lancaster County Courthouse, Lancaster County (104 N. Main St., Lancaster), at South Carolina Department of Archives and History

100 North Main Street - Lancaster County Courthouse

Historic American Buildings Survey in South Carolina
National Historic Landmarks in South Carolina
Courthouses on the National Register of Historic Places in South Carolina
Buildings and structures in Lancaster County, South Carolina
Government buildings completed in 1828
County courthouses in South Carolina
Robert Mills buildings
National Register of Historic Places in Lancaster County, South Carolina